Houstonville may refer to:
Houstonville, Alabama, a place in Baldwin County, Alabama
Houstonville, Illinois, an extinct village in Champaigne County, Illinois, United States
Houstonville, North Carolina, an unincorporated community in  Iredell County, North Carolina, United States

See also